George Olivier, Count of Wallis (1671, in Vienna – 19 December 1743, in Vienna) was a field marshal of Irish descent in the service of the Holy Roman Empire and the Kingdom of the Two Sicilies and last regent of the Habsburg Kingdom of Serbia (1738–1739). Born into an Irish family, he distinguished himself in Sicily by his capture of Messina. He then commanded on the Rhine (1733), then in Italy and Hungary. He lost the decisive Battle of Grocka against the Ottoman Empire in 1739, thus leading to the peace of Belgrade, which was unfavourable to Austria and thus led to his disgrace.

Family

Ancestry 
Georg Olivier's ancestor was Richard Wallis of Carrickmines, County Dublin, who became one of the first Irish officers in imperial service in 1632. He died later that year after being wounded in the Battle of Lützen. Richard's eldest son Theobald returned to Ireland, with this branch of the family from then on taking the name Walsh, whilst his youngest son Olivier remained in the imperial Austrian army and became the founder of the Austrian Wallis branch before dying in 1667 as a major general in Hungary. Theobald's son, Feldzeugmeister Ernst Georg Wallis (died 1689) was the father of George Olivier and his elder brother  (died 1737).

Marriage and issue 
George Olivier of Wallis married for the first time to Countess Maria Antonia von Götzen. After her death he married Countess Maria Theresia Kinsky von Wchinitz and Tettau (1721–1751). His only son and heir was Georg Stephan (19 July 1744 – 5 February 1832).

Life 
After his father Ernst Georg Wallis's death in 1689 in the Nine Years' War during the Siege of Mainz, George Olivier became a page at the Vienna court and just one year later became a lieutenant in the imperial army. In 1697 he fought as a hauptmann at the battle of Zenta. During the War of the Spanish Succession (1701–14) he first served in northern Italy (rising to command a regiment as oberst in 1703), then from 1707 in the conquest of Naples. He also served in Spain until 1713 and by the end of the war had reached the rank of Feldmarschall-Leutnants.

He fought again in the Ottoman–Venetian War (1714–1718), under the command of Prince Eugene of Savoy at the Battle of Petrovaradin on 5 August 1716 and at the sieges of Temesvár and Belgrade. The following year he was put in command of three regiments and posted to operations in Naples. In the War of the Quadruple Alliance (1718–20) he fought in the Austrian army on Sicily, being wounded in the struggle for Messina but later becoming governor of that city's fortress until 1727, when he returned to Austria. When the Anglo-Spanish War (1727–1729) threatened to escalate the Holy Roman Emperor ordered Olivier back to Sicily to ready the island's defences. When no attack on Sicily came Olivier was dismissed in 1731 and from then until 1734 commanded the fortress at Mainz. In the War of the Polish Succession (1733–1735/38) he served against France in northern Italy (from 1723 with the rank of Feldzeugmeister); he even took overall command of the whole Austrian force there for a time and won some advantages.

In the Austro-Russian–Turkish War (1735–1739) he commanded an Austrian corps and was shortly afterwards promoted to field marshal. In the last year of the war he was the Austrian army's supreme commander but he lost the decisive battle of Grocka on 22 July 1739. Only a week after the battle Austria was forced to sign the Peace of Belgrade, losing large swathes of territory to the Ottoman Empire. Olivier was one of the main culprits for the defeat, was tried with other generals before a war tribunal and on 22 February 1740 was sentenced to imprisonment at the fortress at Spielberg. On the death of Charles VI he was pardoned by Maria Theresa of Austria in November the same year. He then spent his final years on his lands, often being consulted by Vienna on military matters. The war against the Turks, however, had caused lasting damage to his brilliant military reputation, as is reflected in later historians' assessments of him.

Lands 
In addition to the Bohemian estates of Kolešovice, Petrowice and Hochlibin, Olivier acquired or inherited several properties in the County of Glatz. He was lord of Wallisfurth, Seitenberg and Kunzendorf. On his brother Franz Paul's death in 1737 he inherited Plomnitz, Kieslingswalde, Glasegrund, Weißbrod, Altwaltersdorf, Kaiserswalde and Friedrichswald in Bohemia. On his death in 1744 his estates were inherited by his son Stephan (died 1832), although he sold Hassitz and Stolz to Friedrich Wilhelm, count of Schlabrendorf.

Wallis was the wartime and last governor of the Kingdom of Serbia, from November 1738 until the accession of the crownland back to the Ottoman Empire in late 1739 according to the Treaty of Belgrade, from which it was carved out in accordance to the Treaty of Passarowitz of 1717. Serbia was previously for a time governed from the Ottoman Empire between 1689 and 1691, after the great defeat at Vienna during the Great Turkish War. A short-lived restoration of the Serbian Kingdom would follow during the Austro-Turkish war in 1788 during the occupation of those regions.

Bibliography 
 
 Brennan: Paintings in a Military Academy
 Murtagh: Irish Soldiers in Central Europe 1600 - 1800, in: Irish Sword, Jg. 1990.
 Bernhard von Poten (Hrsg.): Handwörterbuch der gesamten Militärwissenschaften, Bd. 5, Bielefeld/Leipzig 1878.
 Joseph Kögler: Die Chroniken der Grafschaft Glatz. Newly edited by Dieter Pohl. Band 3, S. 369–370

External links 
 Genealogy

1671 births
1743 deaths
17th-century Austrian people
18th-century Austrian people
Field marshals of Austria
Austrian army commanders in the War of the Spanish Succession
Recipients of Austrian royal pardons
Austrian people of Irish descent
Barons of Austria
Military personnel from Vienna
Generals of the Holy Roman Empire
Nobility from Vienna